Isabella Banks (25 March 1821 – 4 May 1897), also known as Mrs G. Linnaeus Banks, was an English novelist and poet. Born in Manchester, England, Banks is most widely remembered today for her book The Manchester Man, published in 1876.

Early years
Isabella Varley, was born on 25 March 1821 above her father's pharmacy at 10 Oldham Street, in the area now known as Manchester's Northern Quarter. Isabella developed a keen interest in the history of Manchester and its political development. Both her father, James and her mother Amelia were active in politics long before the period when the City of Manchester had its own parliamentary representatives; her father held several official civic roles in his lifetime as a town alderman and magistrate. Isabella's other interest was in writing; her flair was first noted when The Manchester Guardian published her poem A Dying Girl to her Mother in 1837. Her first collection of poetry, Ivy Leaves, was published in 1844.

Writing career

Isabella married George Banks in 1846, after which, in the style of the times, she mostly published under the name of Mrs G. Linnaeus Banks, although she sometimes wrote under her maiden name, Isabella Varley. She had eight children (although only three survived into adulthood). Her husband George was a journalist and editor who worked in various locations throughout the UK.

In the early 1860s, Isabella's eldest child died (then aged 14), and her sense of loss is believed to have inspired her to write her first novel, God's Providence House: The famous story of old Chester, which presented an absorbing story of love and adventure set in the days of highwaymen and plague around the area of Chester in Cheshire, in which one character lived on Watergate Street with "God's Providence is Mine Inheritance" written on its frontage beam, being one of the few houses not struck by plague. In 1865 she co-authored Daisies in the Grass: a collection of songs and poems, with her husband. The Making of William Edwards or The Story of the Bridge of Beauty was also their joint endeavour. Her many literary works included The Watchmaker's Daughter and Other Tales, Forbidden to Marry (two vols), More than Coronets (1881), Caleb Booth's Clerk: A Lancashire Story (1878), Glory: A Wiltshire Story, Sybilla and other Stories (1885), Miss Pringle's Pearls, and Bond Slaves – the story of struggle (1893), a social novel about Luddites in the North of England. Some of these works went through many editions, re-appearing several times during the 20th century, and some are currently published for sale today as print-on demand editions.

The Manchester Man

Banks's novel The Manchester Man was first serialised in Cassell's Magazine between January and November 1874, before being published in three volumes in 1876. The book became her most lasting achievement and is considered to be an important social and historical novel, charting the rise of Jabez Clegg, the eponymous "Manchester Man", from the time of the Napoleonic Wars to the first Reform Act. His personal fortunes, from the near tragic snatch of his crib from the River Irk, create a tale of romance and melodrama, his life from apprentice to master and from poverty to wealth, mirroring the growth and prosperity of the city. This is achieved in a politico-historical setting, with vivid accounts of the Peterloo Massacre of 1819 and the Corn-Law riots (the Anti-Corn Law League was formed in Manchester in 1838). In 1896, the year before she died, a well-illustrated edition of The Manchester Man was published with forty-six plates and three maps.

The book is still read throughout the world (following republication in 1991 and again in 1998), and its heroes, Jabez Clegg and Joshua Brooks, are commemorated locally in the names of Manchester public houses. A quotation from the novel ('Mutability is the epitaph of worlds / Change alone is changeless / People drop out of the history of a life as of a land though their work or their influence remains') forms the epitaph on the tombstone of Tony Wilson, one of the founders of Factory Records in Manchester.

Anthony Trollope greatly admired Isabella Banks's contribution to literature, and is reported to have observed that her "reward in literary life had fallen short of [her] deserts". Shortly thereafter a charity Trollope was involved with, the Royal Literary Fund, provided Isabella with £355.

Political interests
Isabella Banks was involved in campaigning for women's rights, lecturing on Woman, as She was, as She is, and as She may Be. She was a member of the Ladies Committee of the Anti-Corn Law League from 1842.

Death and memorial
Banks died on 4 May 1897 at her home in London. She was buried in the Little Elm Walk at Abney Park Cemetery, Stoke Newington, in London, alongside her husband, who had died in 1881. In 2015, she was honoured with a street named after her within Manchester's First Street development.

References
Notes

Bibliography

Andrews, W., North Country Poets, 2 vols, 1888–89. 
Hayes, Cliff, 'Memories', Manchester Evening News p. 32 26 October 1991
Hays, F., Women of the Day, 1885

Manchester Faces and Places, 17 vols, 1889–1906

External links

 
 
  
 
 The Manchester Man – Chapters 1 – 16 (Not complete book) PDF 445kb
 

English women novelists
English women poets
Writers from Manchester
1821 births
1897 deaths
Burials at Abney Park Cemetery
Victorian women writers
Victorian writers
19th-century English poets
19th-century English novelists
People from Dalston
Lancashire and Cheshire Antiquarian Society